Jansonius is a genus of leaf beetles in the subfamily Eumolpinae. It is found in Chile and Argentina. It was formerly placed in the tribe Adoxini, section Myochroites, but is now placed in Nodinini, section Metachromites.

Species
The genus contains at least one valid species:
 Jansonius aeneus (Blanchard, 1851) (Synonyms: Eumolpus? valdivianus Philippi & Philippi, 1864; Chaetocnema blanchardi Baly, 1877; Jansonius alternatus Baly, 1878)

Dia patagonica Boheman, 1858, also from Chile, was placed in the genus by Jan Bechyné in 1953, but as the type is apparently lost or destroyed, this species is considered incertae sedis in Eumolpinae by Askevold & LeSage (1990).

Several additional species were described in or assigned to the genus by Jan Bechyné from other countries in South America, though these may not belong to the genus according to Askevold & LeSage (1990):
 Jansonius boggianii (Jacoby, 1899) – Paraguay, Argentina
 Jansonius pubescens Bechyné, 1955 – Paraguay
 Jansonius scolytinus Bechyné & Bechyné, 1961 – Brazil
 Jansonius vigiensis Bechyné & Bechyné, 1961 – Brazil

References

Eumolpinae
Chrysomelidae genera
Beetles of South America
Taxa named by Joseph Sugar Baly